The Eastern Distributor is a  motorway in Sydney, New South Wales, Australia. Part of the M1, the motorway links the Sydney central business district with Sydney Airport. The Eastern Distributor separates Sydney's Eastern Suburbs from Sydney's Inner-Southern Suburbs. The centre-piece is a  tunnel running from Woolloomooloo to Surry Hills. Built as a build-own-operate-transfer project, it is 75.1% owned by Transurban.

The motorway opened to traffic in December 1999 with the project completed in July 2000. It is only tolled in the northbound direction.

The length of  used in this article refers to the length of the motorway constructed in the 1990s between the southern end of Cahill Expressway (Cowper Wharf Road) and the northern end of Southern Cross Drive (Link Road).

Design

This motorway is part of the  Sydney Orbital Network. For about half its length, it is in a trench inside South Dowling Street. The motorway provides a southbound exit for Lachlan Street/Dacey Avenue, a northbound exit to South Dowling Street (south of Cleveland Street), a northbound entrance ramp from South Dowling Street (north of Cleveland Street), connections from William Street (heading south), and to William Street (heading north). There are also connection to the Cross City Tunnel, giving motorists direct connections under the city to the Western Distributor. There are also northbound/southbound entry/exits to Moore Park Road and Anzac Parade. Southbound motorists were later found to be entering the Eastern Distributor from the Cross City Tunnel access point and immediately attempting to cross three lanes for the Anzac Parade off-ramp. Permanent traffic obstacles have subsequently been installed and users are now referred to the Lachlan Street/Dacey Avenue exit, or as through traffic towards Sydney Airport.

The project's centrepiece is the  piggyback tunnel under one of Australia's most densely populated urban areas, necessitated due to the requirement of three lanes in each direction within the existing roadway corridor. The unique double-deck, three lanes per direction design comprises a large, single tunnel excavation. At mid-height through the excavation, a precast concrete ledge forms the base of the northbound tunnel, with the southbound tunnel slotting below. As a result, only one tunnel roof was created with the lower southbound carriageway built in a slot. According to the Australasian Tunnelling Society, no records are available of any piggyback tunnel (rail or road) where the upper carriageway has been carried on prestressed concrete planks resting on sidewall ledges.

This point occurs where the William Street on ramp tunnel merges with the main tunnel. At , the tunnel is also notably tall (from the ceiling to the floor).

The tunnels of the Eastern Distributor are fully equipped with lighting, ventilation, drainage, CCTV surveillance, fire fighting and emergency control systems.

History

County of Cumberland planning scheme

The need for an Eastern Distributor was first discussed in the early 1950s in the County of Cumberland planning scheme.

Underpasses of the Eastern Distributor beneath William Street and Taylor Street were proposed to commence construction in 1974. The construction never eventuated.

1984 scheme
In 1984, the Department of Main Roads proposed construction of the Eastern Distributor as a surface freeway with underpasses at William Street and Oxford Street. It was later redesigned into a tunnel from north of William Street to the intersections of South Dowling, Moore Park Road and Anzac Parade. An Environmental Impact Statement (EIS) was prepared on 1985 to be built in three stages:
 Stage 1: A southbound tunnel underpass under William Street (William Street underpass) and a roundabout at the Riley Street / Sir John Young Crescent intersection, scheduled for completion in 1988
 Stage 2: Southbound tunnel for the full length and a reconfigured Cahill Expressway intersection with Sir John Young Crescent. Bourke Street and Palmer Street including the William Street underpass would also be reversed for northbound travel. Stage 2 was scheduled for completion in 1990
 Stage 3: Northbound tunnel from Flinders Street connecting directly to the William Street underpass, scheduled for completion in 1992
The William Street underpass (Stage 1) opened in November 1987 and connected Cahill Expressway and Palmer Street to Bourke Street. The underpass allowed southbound traffic from the Cahill Expressway to avoid intersecting William Street. The rest of the 1984 scheme was abandoned and not constructed due to escalating costs. The William Street underpass would eventually be closed permanently twelve years later after the main Eastern Distributor tunnels opened to traffic in December 1999, and was reconstructed to form part of the Bourke Street on-ramp which opened seven months later.

1994 scheme
The completion of the Sydney Harbour Tunnel in 1992 resulted in an increase in volumes on the Cahill Expressway and therefore an increased need for an inner-city bypass south and south-east of the expressway. Roads & Traffic Authority (RTA) undertook community consultation to gauge the level of community acceptance of construction of the Eastern Distributor as a toll road. With indications of a high level of community support, the Eastern Distributor project was revived by the New South Wales state government in 1994, based on the 1984 scheme.  The Eastern Distributor would link the Sydney central business district with Sydney Airport via the already existing Southern Cross Drive (freeway), which would be widened. It was designed to ease congestion and to reduce the time to travel from the city to the airport by bypassing 19 traffic lights. A study commissioned by the State Chamber of Commerce in 1997 found that the "Eastern Distributor would prevent 330 accidents a year and cut fuel consumption by 1.2 million litres annually".

Tender process
In May 1994, the state government gave approval for RTA to invite the private sector to tender to construct and operate the tollway under a build-own-operate-transfer arrangement. In February and March 1995, three proponents were invited to develop detailed proposals. RTA later requested the proponents to submit revised offers based on a concession term of 38 years, as "a term of 45 years would be unacceptable to the community" and the 38 year term had already been set as a precedent by the M2 Motorway.

The Labor state opposition promised that if elected, the Eastern Distributor would be toll-free. When Labor was elected as government in March 1995, the formal tender process had already commenced, and the new government had to proceed with constructing the Eastern Distributor as a tollway. In November 1995, the government agreed with RTA's recommendation to appoint Airport Motorway Limited (AML) as the successful proponent, with the government providing planning, support and management during construction. The other two unsuccessful proponents were Baulderstone Hornibrook and Transfield.

The Keating federal government announced on 15 December 1995 that it intended to withdraw taxation concessions on infrastructure bonds for urban road projects, "effective immediately". In a response letter written to the federal treasurer Ralph Willis in January 1996, the state treasurer Michael Egan highlighted that the policy would impact the M5 East and Eastern Distributor projects, and estimated that the policy would result in an "increase the cost of the Eastern Distributor project by between $70 million and $90 million". As a result, the announcement was "sufficient to halt the progress of the Eastern Distributor project" and the appointment of AML as the successful proponent was not formally endorsed. The policy was not enacted into legislation by the Keating government prior to the March 1996 federal election. The newly-elected Howard government reversed the policy in June 1996 and confirmed that the Eastern Distributor has been certified as "an urban road project which may utilise infrastructure bonds for financing purposes".

Following the reversal of the federal government policy, on 13 August 1996 the appointment of AML as the successful proponent and the decision to proceed with the project was formally announced. The agreement was signed in 1997, and under the concession agreement, AML would own and operate the tollway for 38 years after full opening.

Planning
In 1994, RTA decided to delay the EIS until after the selection of the preferred proponent, explaining that if an EIS was prepared then (1994), then "it is unlikely to
contain the most innovative solutions to construction and environmental issues and could require a further EIS being required before work could commence". However, there would be a risk that substantial changes to the EIS would risk a new tender.

The EIS for the Eastern Distributor was eventually exhibited in November to December 1996. 2,762 submissions were received during the exhibition period. RTA proposed significant modifications in April 1997, which included:
 a landscaped canopy over the northern end of the motorway (where it meets Cahill Expressway) near the Art Gallery
 relocation of the northern tunnel portal north of Cathedral Street
 lowering of the motorway in a trench between South Dowling Street (known as the "Parkway scheme")

Due to the substantial modifications, RTA sought advice from the Independent Commission Against Corruption (ICAC) on whether a new tender was required; ICAC later advised that it was not required.

The New South Wales Audit Office undertook a performance audit of the proposed tollway and tabled its report in Parliament on 28 May 1997, with the report finalised in July 1997. A planning assessment report by the Director-General of Department of Urban Affairs and Planning was published on 2 June 1997, and the project was approved by the Minister for Urban Affairs and Planning on 26 June 1997, subject to 151 conditions. Actual construction started soon after in August 1997.

Construction
Construction using 5,000 workers was undertaken by Leighton Contractors, who was a shareholder of Airport Motorway Limited. Two separate tunnel subcontractors began excavating the northbound tunnel in January 1998, working at either end of the tunnel at Surry Hills and Woolloomooloo. Seven roadheaders were utilised for the tunnel boring, with the rock ceiling then reinforced with rock bolts and shotcrete. On 4 December 1998, the two teams were shaking hands in the middle– beneath Taylor Square. By March 1999, all digging had been completed, after  of soil, largely Sydney sandstone was removed–equal to 40,000 truckloads.

At a cost of $730 million, the motorway was opened on 19 December 1999, except for the William Street on- and off-ramps which were opened on 23 July 2000, just in time for the 2000 Summer Olympics. As part of the agreement which defined the 48 years of concession period, the motorway will be due to revert to government ownership on 23 July 2048.

After opening, a number of changes were made to surface streets:
 Crown Street was converted from one-way northbound to two-way
 Bourke St was converted from one-way southbound to two-way traffic (south of William Street), closed off at Taylor Square, and closed off to northbound traffic just north of the southbound Eastern Distributor on-ramp
 Palmer St was converted from one-way southbound to two-way traffic (north of William Street)
 Campbell Street was closed off at Taylor Square

Post-opening
Toll booths initially operated at toll points along the Eastern Distributor. With the progressive introduction of electronic tolls, in 2012, these were replaced by readers on a gantry and demolished. 

In July 2017, the northbound off-ramp exit onto South Dowling Street towards Cleveland Street was closed off for 24 hours per day, 7 days a week, on a six-month trial (initially three months). Prior to the closure, the exit was the last northbound exit before toll and was closed during morning and afternoon peaks. Vehicles would regularly queue at the South Dowling Street/Cleveland Street intersection and spill back onto the motorway via the exit. The trial closure saw significant improvements to traffic congestion along both South Dowling Street and the Eastern Distributor, and increase in speeds on both roads. Following the successful trial, the exit was permanently closed in February 2018.

Tolls

Ownership
The Eastern Distributor is owned and operated by Airport Motorway Limited (AML), which is 75.1% owned by Transurban. The remaining shareholders are Industry Funds Management (14.37%) and UniSuper (10.53%).

When AML was incorporated, Leighton Group held 11% of AML, with Macquarie Infrastructure Group being the holder of the balance. Leighton sold its stake to Macquarie Infrastructure in 2000. By 2005, Macquarie Infrastructure Group held 71.35% of AML. Macquarie Infrastructure Group spun off Sydney Roads Group including its stake in AML in July 2006. Sydney Roads Group was sold to Transurban in April 2007. In September 2007, Transurban further acquired a 3.75% stake in AML, increasing its stake to 75.1% stake which it held to this day.

Toll prices
The Eastern Distributor is tolled in the northbound direction only for all traffic that use the main tunnel (Surry Hills/Moore Park to Woolloomooloo). There are two toll points on the Eastern Distributor: one at the northern end of the motorway and one at the William Street/Cross City Tunnel exit. Northbound vehicles along Eastern Distributor are charged the same toll price in either toll point.

Exits and interchanges

See also 

 Freeways in Sydney
 List of tunnels in Australia

References

External links 

 Official Site

Highways in Sydney
Tunnels in Sydney
Toll roads in Australia
Tunnels completed in 2000
Highway 1 (Australia)
Road tunnels in Australia
Surry Hills, New South Wales
Moore Park, New South Wales
Kensington, New South Wales
Woolloomooloo
Darlinghurst, New South Wales
Redfern, New South Wales